Puula (or Puulavesi) is a lake in the Kymi River area in the Finnish municipalities of Hirvensalmi, Kangasniemi and Mikkeli. Two big lakes Suontee and Puula were one lake until year 1854, when the water level was lowered 2.5 meters. This has brought up geological stacks, which are formed by water.

Water from lake Puula runs down to Vahvajärvi through Kissakoski Canal.

Puula is known as a body of water with lake trout and lake salmon and it is therefore popular among trollers. The largest lake salmon in Finland in the 21st century, which weighed 12.4 kg, came from Puula. Multi-kilo trout are a typical catch from Puula.

See also
 List of lakes in Finland

References

External links
 

Kymi basin
Lakes of Joutsa
Lakes of Kangasniemi
Lakes of Hirvensalmi
Lakes of Mikkeli